The Howard 500 is an American executive transport aircraft produced by Howard Aero Incorporated during the early 1960s.

Design and development
During the 1950s and '60s, Howard Aero Inc., led by Durrell U. "Dee" Howard, had been remanufacturing military surplus Lockheed Lodestars and Lockheed Venturas for the executive market. Conversions of multi-engine World War II warplanes into business aircraft were popular at the time, and Howard came to prefer Lockheed designs, as he found heavy transports such as the C-47 to be too slow and light bombers such as the Douglas A-26 lacking in interior space.

While the Howard 500 bears a strong resemblance to the Lodestar and Ventura, it is a substantially new design with a completely new fuselage designed from the outset for pressurization, unlike those of its Lockheed forebears. The only major components taken directly from the Lockheeds were the outer wing panels (from surplus Venturas) and undercarriage (from PV-2 Harpoons). Howard purchased wing and fuselage jigs from Lockheed to use as patterns for jigs for the new aircraft, while the wings were designed wet. The 500 is a luxurious aircraft with a spacious cabin, ample baggage capacity, a large door situated close to the ground for easy entry, and an onboard toilet.

The engine chosen was a new, higher-power and lighter-weight version of the Pratt & Whitney R-2800 that had been developed for the Douglas DC-6. Propeller hubs were taken from F4U Corsairs, four-blade propellers and spinners from DC-7s. The Howard 500 could accommodate 10 to 14 passengers with a large window for each.

The prototype flew in September 1959, and type certification was achieved on February 20, 1963. However, by the mid 1960s, turboprops and business jets with tricycle landing gear were being introduced by major manufacturers; while the Howard 500 compared favorably with these aircraft in terms of speed and range, it was an anachronistic taildragger with piston engines, resulting in limited sales.

Twenty-two Howard 500s were produced initially, with a further eight being converted from earlier PV-2s to virtually the same standard.

Operators
Commercial firms operating the aircraft included: Republic Steel, Green Construction of Indiana, Nello L. Teer Company, KF Airlines, Pacific Petroleums of Canada, Northern Natural Gas Company and U.S. Metal Refining Company.

Surviving aircraft
 

Of the 17 examples built to the full Howard 500 standard, two restored aircraft remained flying in 2019: aircraft registration N500HP (serial number 500-105,) and N500LN, both owned by TP Aero and based in Anoka, Minnesota.

Specifications

See also

Notes

References

Bibliography

External links

 N500HP web site
 Howard 500 on Lockheed Twins site
 The Howard 500 Project - Development of Howard 500 model for Microsoft Flight Simulator, with extensive detail, photographs, and movies of real aircraft.
 Rare Vintage Bizliner Hits The Market

1950s United States business aircraft
Aircraft first flown in 1959
Twin piston-engined tractor aircraft